Epicopeia leucomelaena is a moth in the family Epicopeiidae. It was described by Oberthür in 1919. It is found in China.

References

Moths described in 1919
Epicopeiidae